BattleGround: 21 Days on the Empire's Edge was released in 2004, and received the Silver Hugo Award for documentaries at the 2004 Chicago International Film Festival. It aired on Showtime and was released on DVD by Home Vision. The film follows the story of Frank al-Bayati, a former Shiite guerrilla traveling back to Iraq for the first time since the 1991 uprising against Saddam Hussein. Al-Bayati was wounded, captured, tortured and then escaped. He spent more than a year in a Saudi Arabian refugee camp before being repatriated to the U.S. Lappé and Marshall follow al-Bayati as he tracks down his family members and capture the emotional reunions. Al-Bayati's optimism for what he calls "liberated Iraq" is countered by the reality the filmmakers find on the ground. A growing insurgency is creating more enemies than it is killing. With candid interviews with top American commanders, the filmmakers capture the U.S. military's inability to grasp the nature of their enemy. In addition, Lappé and Marshall bring a Geiger counter and conduct their own radiation tests on Iraqi armor that has been hit by American shells. They find evidence of the use of depleted uranium, the controversial radioactive metal used in some American munitions.

The film was directed by Stephen Marshall, and produced by Anthony Lappé and Lisa Hsu.

See also
Meeting Resistance

References

External links
 Official web site
 
 

2004 films
American documentary films
Documentary films about the Iraq War
American independent films
2004 documentary films
2004 independent films
2000s English-language films
2000s American films